Fintona Girls' School is a small, independent, non-denominational, day school for girls, located in Balwyn,   Melbourne, Victoria, Australia.

Established in 1896, Fintona is a non-selective school and currently caters for approximately 600 students from the Early Learning Centre (ELC) to Year 12.

Fintona is a member of Girls Sport Victoria (GSV), the Alliance of Girls Schools Australia (AGSA), the Junior School Heads Association of Australia (JSHAA), and the Association of Heads of Independent Schools of Australia (AHISA).

History
Fintona was established as a Presbyterian, day and boarding school for girls, in 1896. The school was founded by Annie Hughston and was originally located in the Melbourne suburb of Camberwell.

The school occupies 'Balwyn', the historic home and vineyard built by early settler Andrew Murray, from which the suburb of Balwyn takes its name.

Principals

Curriculum
Fintona Girls' School is divided into 4 teaching sections: 
The Early Learning Centre (ELC)
Junior School, catering for Prep to Year 4
Middle School, catering for Years 5 to Year 8
Senior School, catering for Years 9 to 12

The school's ELC curriculum is based on the Reggio Emilia approach to education. From Prep to Year 6, students are involved in the International Baccalaureate Primary Years Program which covers the subject areas of language, social studies, mathematics, science and technology, arts, and personal, social and physical education. Senior School students are prepared for the Victorian Certificate of Education, in which Fintona is consistently ranked as one of the best performing girls schools in Victoria. In 2006, Fintona was ranked in the top five schools in the state of Victoria, based on its VCE results, with 33% of study scores over 40. Fintona was ranked the No. 1 non-selective school in Australia based on the Naplan results in 2011.

Fintona offers three languages, Latin, French and Japanese.

Houses
The three Junior School (P-4) houses of Fintona are Bedggood, Menzies and Reid.  The six Middle and Senior School (years 5-12) houses of Fintona are Boyne (after school benefactors), Clarke (after first Fintona boarder and matriculant), Hughston (after first headmistress), Murdoch (after Patrick John Murdoch of Trinity Church, Camberwell, where many boarders attended), Maxwell (after father of one of Fintona's first prefects), Ower (after member of staff 1900 - 1930).

Sport 
Fintona is a member of Girls Sport Victoria (GSV).

GSV premierships 
Fintona has won the following GSV premiership.

 Basketball - 2001

Notable alumnae

Ex-students of Fintona Girls' School are known as 'Old Fintonians' and may elect to join the 'Old Fintonians Association'. Some notable 'Old Fintonians' include:

Academic
 Alison Harcourt AO (née Doig) - pioneer statistician
 Edith Gladys Pendred - influential educator (dux 1915)

Business
Diana Eirene Angliss Gibson AO - company director and grazier
Lucinda Hartley - co-founder and chief executive of CoDesign Studio, CoFounder of Neighbourlytics

Media, entertainment and the arts
 Joanna Syme - musician in the band Big Scary
 Hannah Greenwood - actress 
 Lorna Mary Belton Stirling - musicologist
 Eleanore Watson - one of Australia's first female journalists
Norma Bull - Australian painter
Luka Gracie - Actor, Writer, and Trans Activist

Medicine and science
 Dora Mary Lush - pioneer bacteriologist
 Catherine Anne Money - Scientist at CSIRO 
Politics and the law
 Dame Beryl Beaurepaire AC, DBE (née Bedggood) - feminist, former chairwoman of the Federal Women's Committee of the Liberal Party of Australia, wife of Ian Beaurepaire (of Beaurepaire tyre's fame)
Helen Caldicott - environmentalist and anti-nuclear campaigner
 Andrea Coote - politician
 Pattie Maie Menzies (née Leckie) - wife of former prime minister Robert Menzies, appointed Dame Grand Cross of the Order of the British Empire (Civil) for public duty in hospital work

Sport
 Louise Bawden - Olympic volleyball player
 Georgia Griffith - Tokyo 2020 Olympics middle distance athlete

See also 
 List of schools in Victoria
 Victorian Certificate of Education

References

Further reading 
 Chilvers, B.J. 1946. The History of Fintona 1896-1946. Fintona Girls' School, Melbourne.
 Reichl, P. 1986. Fintona 1896 - 1986: The Story in Pictures. Fintona Girls' School, Melbourne.

External links
Fintona Girls' School official website

Girls' schools in Victoria (Australia)
Educational institutions established in 1896
Nondenominational Christian schools in Melbourne
Junior School Heads Association of Australia Member Schools
International Baccalaureate schools in Australia
1896 establishments in Australia
Alliance of Girls' Schools Australasia
Buildings and structures in the City of Boroondara